WXLR (104.9 FM, "The X") is a radio station licensed to serve Harold, Kentucky. The station is owned by Adam D. Gearheart.  It airs a Classic rock music format.

The station has been assigned these call letters by the Federal Communications Commission since November 10, 1993.

References

External links
WXLR official website
WXLR1049fm facebook

XLR
Classic rock radio stations in the United States